Kerry G. Johnson is an African-American cartoonist, graphic designer, art director, caricaturist and children's book  illustrator. He specializes in caricatures but has created cartoons, illustrations and news graphic work (maps, information graphics, feature page design) in his career in newspaper and publication design.

Early life and education
He was born in Nashville, Tennessee on September 30, 1966. He attended Hillsboro Comprehensive High School, Columbus College of Art and Design and Ohio State University in Columbus, Ohio. Johnson is a member of Alpha Phi Alpha fraternity. He currently resides in Columbia, Maryland with his wife, Tawanda W. Johnson, a public relations executive along with their daughter and son.

Career
In 2005, he illustrated a coloring book for the American Physical Society about famous physicists. In 2005, he designed the official logo for the American Physical Society.

In May 2008, he debuted his webcomic, Harambee Hills. Harambee Hills is a diverse webcomic that follows the life observations of Gerard and those of his modern African-American family, co-workers and wacky neighbors of Harambee Hills, a fictional suburban neighborhood outside Washington, D.C. The webcomic’s characters often provide commentary on pop culture, entertainment, sports and top news stories.

He is the co-creator of the science-based teen superhero SPECTRA. Spectra, the main character, is also the mascot for Laserfest 2010, a yearlong celebration of the 50th anniversary of the laser. In 2011, Johnson worked with writer Rebecca Thompson and published their third comic book, Spectra, The Original Laserfest Superhero, for the PhysicsCentral.com web site.

In 2012, he worked with author Nicolle Brazil and illustrated the book You Can't Move an Elephant in One Day.

In August 2018, he was interviewed by Al Jazeera America regarding the 50th birthday of Peanuts comic strip. Franklin and he provided commentary on the status of modern-day African-American cartoonists.

Johnson's Judge Ketanji Brown Jackson caricature
In April 2022, Kerry G. Johnson designed a digital caricature illustration honoring Judge Ketanji Brown Jackson and her historic confirmation to the U.S. Supreme Court. The popular caricature by the artist became widely shared and reproduced on the internet. Kerry G. Johnson retains the copyright to the artwork © 2022 - All Rights Reserved

List of contributions
His cartoons, illustrations and information graphics have appeared in these newspapers:
The Nashville Banner (defunct newspaper)
Columbus Dispatch (Ohio)
North Hills News Record (Warrendale, PA)
Valley News Dispatch (Tarentum, PA)
New Pittsburgh Courier
Pittsburgh Post-Gazette
Pittsburgh Tribune-Review
Greensburg Tribune-Review
The Baltimore Sun
The Baltimore Examiner
The Los Angeles Times
Chicago Tribune
N.Y. Newsday
APS News American Physical Society
The Muskegon Tribune (Michigan)

Additionally, his work has appeared in magazines, web sites and other national media outlets including 60 Minutes, USA Today, KRT (Knight-Ridder Tribune Graphics) (closed), and Gannett News Service.

Awards and honors
Kerry G. Johnson has won over 20 Awards for his work in graphic design and illustration including:

2012, Graphic Design Magazine (GD USA) Award for InHouse Design
2010, Glyph Comics Awards nominated in the Rising Star category, presented by the East Coast Black Age of Comics Convention (ECBACC)
2008, first place: the National Arts Program for Illustration
2002, 2001, 1996, first place: Press Club of Western Pennsylvania’s Golden Quill Award for News Illustration
2002, Society for News Design Award of Excellence for Photo illustration
2001, judge: Pittsburgh’s 2001 ARTWorks Competition
2001, 1998, 1994, 1993, first place: Pittsburgh Black Media Federation’s Robert L. Vann Award for Feature Illustration
2000, second place: National Newspaper Publishers Association’s Heritage Award for Editorial Cartooning
1996, first place: National Association of Black Journalists NABJ Award for Art and Design
1994, first place: Pennsylvania Newspaper Publishers Association’s Award for Graphic Illustration

He is a member of Alpha Phi Alpha (ΑΦΑ) fraternity, the National Cartoonists Society (NCS), the Society of Children's Book Writers and Illustrators (SCBWI), the National Association of Black Journalists (NABJ), the National Caricaturist Network, American Institute of Graphic Arts (AIGA)

He currently lives in Columbia, Maryland with this wife, Tawanda W. Johnson, a public relations executive, along with their daughter and son.

Books 
 Is He Still There? by Monet Clements (illustrator) 2020
 I Am Love: A Book About The Meaning of Love by Alero Afejuku (illustrator) 2020
 Little Brown Baby Nursery Rhymes (illustrator) 2020
 Believing In Myself! by Erica Pullen (illustrator) 2018
 Princess Tyler Meets the Big Storytelling Fsiry (illustrator) 2015
 You Can't Move an Elephant in One Day (illustrator) 2012
 Soap & Bubbles (illustrator) 2012
PhysicsQuest 2008: Nikola Tesla and the Electric Fair (illustrator) 2008
SPECTRA #1: The American Physical Society introduces, SPECTRA (illustrator) 2009
SPECTRA #2: SPECTRA'S Power (illustrator) 2010
SPECTRA #3: SPECTRA'S Force (illustrator) 2011
SPECTRA #4: SPECTRA Heats Up! (illustrator) 2012
 SPECTRA #5: SPECTRA Turbulent Times (illustrator) 2013
 SPECTRA #6: SPECTRA'S Quantum Leap " (illustrator) 2014
Color Me Physics Coloring Book, First Edition Illustrated by Kerry G. Johnson; text by Alan Chodos, PhD, Jessica Clark, PhD and Kendra Rand (2007)

 References 

 Further reading 
: Interview with Al Jazeera America regarding the 50th birthday of Peanuts comic strip Franklin. 
ComicBookCollectorsBlog.com: My 'Take' On: Spectra #1 (illustrated by Kerry G. Johnson) - As Seen At the 2010 San Diego Comic-Con International by Michael D Hamersky, August 17, 2010
The New Pittsburgh Courier Former New Pittsburgh Courier cartoonist nominated for award, Wed. May 19, 2010 
The African American Literature Book Club AALBC.com, Kerry G. Johnson 
PhysicsQuest 2008: Nikola Tesla and the Electric Fair (2009)   Co-written by Rebecca Thompson-Flagg PhD, Christopher DiScenza, Justin Reeder and Kerry G. Johnson; illustrated by Kerry G. Johnson; published by the American Physical Society 
 APS News: Lighting Up Classrooms: PhysicsQuest 2008 book and kits launched; illustrated by Kerry G. Johnson (February 2009, Vol. 18, No. 2) (http://apsweb.aps.org/publications/apsnews/200902/physicsquest.cfm)
Energy Future: Think Efficiency: An Energy Efficiency Report (2008) Art directed and designed by Kerry G. Johnson; published by the American Physical Society 
Color Me Physics Coloring Book, Second Edition Illustrated by Kerry G. Johnson and Krystal Ferguson; text by Alan Chodos, PhD, Jessica Clark, PhD and Becky Thompson-Flagg, PhD (2008)
 The Daily Cartoonist.com News Brief (August 12, 2008) 
 Brooks, Charles, Best Editorial Cartoons of the Year: 2001 Edition: Kerry G. Johnson (page 166) Pelican Publishing, (2001)
 Brooks, Charles, Best Editorial Cartoons of the Year: 1999 Edition: Kerry G. Johnson (page 197) Pelican Publishing, (1999)
 National Association of Black Journalists member profile (Art and Design): Kerry G. Johnson, (1999)
 Top 30 Under 30: Kerry G. Johnson, Urban Profiles magazine, (May 1989)
 Jones, Kimberly, Dimensions Newsmagazine: Editor profile: Kerry G. Johnson'' (1988)

External links
 
 {{instagram | caricaturekerry}}
 {{LinkedIn: Kerry G. Johnson}}
 
Baltimore Sun: Kerry G. Johnson, illustrator - comments on Columbia, MD's 50th anniversary.
 Listed as notable alumni of Hillsboro Comprehensive High School of Nashville, Tennessee
The National Arts Program 
Color Me Physics Coloring Book Illustrated by Kerry G. Johnson; text by Alan Chodos, PhD, Jessica Clark, PhD and Kendra Rand]
Comixpedia.com: About Kerry G. Johnson

American caricaturists
African-American comics creators
American comics creators
American graphic designers
African-American illustrators
American comic strip cartoonists
People from Nashville, Tennessee
People from Columbia, Maryland
American male writers
1966 births
Living people
Ohio State University alumni
American webcomic creators
Columbus College of Art and Design alumni
Pittsburgh Tribune-Review people
Chicago Tribune people
21st-century African-American people
20th-century African-American people
African-American male writers